Ghatampur Assembly constituency  is one of 403 legislative assembly seats of the Uttar Pradesh. It is part of the Akbarpur Lok Sabha constituency Lok Sabha constituency.

Overview
Ghatampur comprises KCs- Rewna, Patara, Ghatampur, Baripal, bhitargaon block, Narwal tehsil and Ghatampur Municipal Corporation of Ghatampur Tehsil.

Members of Legislative Assembly

 *By Election

Election results

2022

2020 (by election)

2017

2012

2007

2002

 
|-
! style="background-color:#E9E9E9" align=left width=225|Party
! style="background-color:#E9E9E9" align=right|Seats won
! style="background-color:#E9E9E9" align=right|Seat change
|-
|align=left|Bharatiya Janata Party
| align="center" | 5
| align="center" | 4
|-
|align=left|Samajwadi Party
| align="center" | 0
| align="center" | 4
|-
|align=left|Bahujan Samaj Party
| align="center" | 0
| align="center" | 0
|-
|align=left|Indian National Congress
| align="center" | 0
| align="center" | 0
|-
|}

See also
 List of Vidhan Sabha constituencies of Uttar Pradesh

References

External links
 

Assembly constituencies of Uttar Pradesh
Kanpur Nagar district